The West Indies cricket team toured India, Pakistan and Ceylon from October 1948 to March 1949 and played a five-match Test series against the India national cricket team. West Indies won the Test series 1–0 with four matches being drawn. The West Indians played three matches in Pakistan in November and four matches in Ceylon in February.

The team
John Goddard (captain)
Gerry Gomez (vice-captain)
Denis Atkinson
Jimmy Cameron
George Carew
Robert Christiani
Wilfred Ferguson
George Headley
Prior Jones 
Cliff McWatt
Allan Rae
Ken Rickards
Jeffrey Stollmeyer
John Trim
Clyde Walcott 
Everton Weekes 

The manager was Donald Lacy, who was the Honorary Secretary and Treasurer of the West Indies Cricket Board of Control. 

Frank Worrell was in dispute with the West Indies Cricket Board of Control and was not selected. Hines Johnson, who had led the attack against England in 1947-48, was unavailable for business reasons.

India

1st Test

2nd Test

3rd Test

4th Test

5th Test

Pakistan
In the first international tour of Pakistan by an overseas team, West Indies played two first-class matches versus Sind at Karachi and a Pakistan XI at Lahore. Both matches were drawn.

First Match

Second Match

Ceylon
The West Indians visited Ceylon in February and played two first-class matches versus Ceylon. West Indies won the first match at Paikiasothy Saravanamuttu Stadium in Colombo by an innings and 22 runs after scoring 462 for two declared with centuries by Allan Rae, Everton Weekes and Clyde Walcott. Prior Jones took ten wickets in the match. The second match at the same venue was drawn, Rae making another century for West Indies.

References

External links
 Cricarchive
 Tour page CricInfo
 Record CricInfo

Further reading
 Jeffrey Stollmeyer, Jeffrey Stollmeyer's Diary: West Indies in India 1948-194, Royards, Macoya (Trinidad), 2004
 R. W. Thick, "West Indies in India, 1948-49", Wisden 1950, pp. 795–821
 Michael Manley, A History of West Indies Cricket, Andre Deutsch, London, 1988, pp. 73–78

1948 in Indian cricket
1948 in Pakistani cricket
1948 in West Indian cricket
1949 in Ceylon
1949 in Indian cricket
1949 in West Indian cricket
Indian cricket seasons from 1945–46 to 1969–70
International cricket competitions from 1945–46 to 1960
Pakistani cricket seasons from 1947–48 to 1969–70
Sri Lankan cricket seasons from 1880–81 to 1971–72
1948-49
1948
1949